Alkaline ceramidase 3 also known as ACER3 is a ceramidase enzyme which in humans is encoded by the ACER3 gene.

References

External links

Further reading

Human proteins